Heinz Ziegler (19 May 1894 – 21 August 1972) was a German general in the Wehrmacht of Nazi Germany during World War II acting commander of the 5th Panzer Army and commander of the 14th Army. He was a recipient of the Knight's Cross of the Iron Cross.

Awards and decorations
 German Cross in Gold on 26 January 1942 as Oberst im Generalstab (in the General Staff) of General-Kommando of the XXXXII. Armeekorps
 Knight's Cross of the Iron Cross on 16 April 1943 as Generalleutnant and commander of Kampfgruppe/Stab Heeresgruppe Afrika, stellv. Führer 5.Panzer-Armee

References

Citations

Bibliography

1894 births
1972 deaths
German Army generals of World War II
Generals of Artillery (Wehrmacht)
German Army personnel of World War I
People from East Prussia
Prussian Army personnel
Recipients of the clasp to the Iron Cross, 1st class
Recipients of the Gold German Cross
Recipients of the Knight's Cross of the Iron Cross